This list consists of fictional detectives from science fiction and fantasy stories.

Science fiction and fantasy
Detectives
Detectives